The 2022–23 Atlantic Hockey men's ice hockey season is the 20th season of play for Atlantic Hockey and will take place during the 2022–23 NCAA Division I men's ice hockey season. The regular season is set to begin on October 1, 2022 and conclude on February 25, 2023. The conference tournament is scheduled to begin in early March, 2023.

Coaches

Records

Standings

Non-Conference record
Of the sixteen teams that are selected to participate in the NCAA tournament, ten will be via at-large bids. Those 10 teams are determined based upon the PairWise rankings. The rankings take into account all games played but are heavily affected by intra-conference results. The result is that teams from leagues which perform better in non-conference are much more likely to receive at-large bids even if they possess inferior records overall.

Atlantic Hockey produced another poor non-conference season. Just one Team finished with a winning record (Niagara) and while some were near .500, most finished well below average in non-league games. The conference as a whole had losing records against all other leagues. They did manage a winning mark against Independent teams, however, many of those victories came against Lindenwood in its first season of varsity play.

Regular season record

Statistics

Leading scorers
GP = Games played; G = Goals; A = Assists; Pts = Points; PIM = Penalty minutes

Leading goaltenders
Minimum 1/3 of team's minutes played in conference games.
GP = Games played; Min = Minutes played; W = Wins; L = Losses; T = Ties; GA = Goals against; SO = Shutouts; SV% = Save percentage; GAA = Goals against average

Conference tournament

NCAA tournament

Ranking

USCHO

USCHO did not release a poll in weeks 1 and 13.

USA Today

Pairwise

Note: teams ranked in the top-10 automatically qualify for the NCAA tournament. Teams ranked 11-16 can qualify based upon conference tournament results.

Awards

Atlantic Hockey

References

External links

2022–23
Atlantic
2022–23